Jedediah Hotchkiss House, also known as Old Stone House, is a historic home located at Windsor in Broome County, New York, United States. It was built about 1823 and is a two-story dwelling with a gable roof constructed of roughly squared creek and fieldstone. It was the birthplace of educator and American Civil War cartographer and topographer Jedediah Hotchkiss (1828–1899).

It was listed on the National Register of Historic Places in 1982.

References

Houses on the National Register of Historic Places in New York (state)
Federal architecture in New York (state)
Houses in Broome County, New York
National Register of Historic Places in Broome County, New York